The Bulqizë mine is a large mine located in central Albania in Dibër County,  east of the capital, Tirana. Bulqizë represents the largest chromium reserve in Albania and one of the largest in Europe, having estimated reserves of 2.82 million tonnes of ore grading 45.83% chromium metal.

The Bulqizë mine began operating in 1942. Between 1942 and 1944 it produced chromium ore only from occurrences. In 1948 production from the mine started. The total combined chromium ore production from the mine between 1948 and 2006 amounted to 13,075,500 tonnes. The chromium ore reserves of the mine are split into two categories above and below Level XVI. The proven ore reserves located above the Level XVI amount to 690,000 tonnes of ore grading 46.75% chromium metal. The proven ore reserves located below the Level XVI amount to 2,126,800 tonnes of ore grading 44.91% chromium metal. The mine's total reserves amount to 2.82 million tonnes of ore grading 45.83% chromium metal. Since 2001 the mine has been owned by the Canadian company Empire Mining Corporation. The Bulqizë mine is one of the eight Albanian chromium mines to have reserves of over 1 million tonnes of chromium ore.

References 

Chromium mines in Albania
Underground mines in Albania
Bulqizë